Brooke Barrettsmith is the eponymous debut album by American singer Brooke Barrettsmith, released on August 19, 2008. Although Brooke had already released two independent albums, this was her first major record label release. The tracks "Farewell", "More Real", and "OK" were released as radio singles.

Track listing

References

2008 debut albums
Brooke Barrettsmith albums